Mattea is a surname. Notable people with the surname include:

Angelo Mattea (1892–1960), Italian footballer and manager
Kathy Mattea (born 1959), American country singer-songwriter

Given name 
Mattea Conforti (born 2006), American actress
Mattea Roach (born 1998), Canadian tutor and Jeopardy! champion

See also 
Matteo